Tonika Sealy-Thompson (born 1977?) is an academic, curator and arts activist from Barbados. She was appointed ambassador to Brazil in 2019, and was Barbados' youngest female ambassador at the time.

Biography 
Sealy-Thompson graduated from Carleton University with a degree in International Trade Policy and Diplomacy. She was also awarded an MA from Hult International Business School, Shanghai Campus, in International Business Administration. She is fluent in French, Spanish, Portuguese, German and Chinese. Prior to her appointment she was studying for a PhD at University of California, Berkeley where her research explored how the performing arts link to politics in three locations: Barbados, the Bay Area and Brazil. In order to take up the appointment, Sealy-Thompson put her research on hold. During her time at Berkeley she hosted anti-racism workshops in addition to her research.

Ambassadorial career 

On 8 March 2019, Sealy-Thompson was accepted by President Bolsonaro as Ambassador to the Federative Republic of Brazil. At the time of her appointment, she was Barbados' youngest woman ambassador at the age of 42. Strengthening diplomatic links between Barbados and countries in South America, including Brazil, is a key element of her work and in 2019 worked with colleagues from Barbados and Argentina to extend their mutual understanding. In 2019, she visited Bahia state to explore connections between it and Barbados, particularly in relation to the shared heritage of the Black population in both places. Sealy-Thompson was also instrumental in establishing a festival of Caribbean culture in Porto Velho, where there a Barbadian community. In 2020, she paid an official visit to Olinda, along with the ambassadors of Romania and Ireland.

Career in the arts 
Sealy-Thompson's first career in the arts, involved working as an international festival director in Cape Verde, Brussels and Barbados. She founded the Fish & Dragon Festival, held in Barbados. She is interested in how creative work can help people recover from trauma. She co-founded, with Stefano Harney, the arts project Ground Provisions. This project explores black metaphysics and the politics of reading.

Awards 
1997 - Tom Adams Prize for outstanding work in the humanities.

References

External links 
The Poetry Center and the SFSU Labor Archives and Research Center co-present "Working with Others: Convivial Research (Revisited)"

1977 births
Living people
Barbadian women ambassadors
Barbadian academics
Ambassadors of Barbados to Brazil
University of California, Berkeley alumni
Carleton College alumni